"The Hanging Tree" is a song by American composer James Newton Howard featuring vocals from American actress Jennifer Lawrence. It was written by Suzanne Collins and composed by Howard, Jeremiah Fraites and Wesley Schultz from the band the Lumineers. The song was released by Republic Records on December 9, 2014, as the second single from the soundtrack for The Hunger Games: Mockingjay, Part 1 (2014). It was first included in the film's score album, but was later added to the digital extended edition of the film's soundtrack. "The Hanging Tree" is a folk ballad that features orchestral strings and a choir.

"The Hanging Tree" received mostly positive reviews from music critics with some praising Lawrence's vocals, its elements of Appalachian music, and its effectiveness as a murder ballad. Commercially, the song garnered success on charts internationally, peaking atop record charts in several markets, including Austria, Hungary and Germany. It debuted and peaked at number 12 on the Billboard Hot 100 and at number 20 in the United Kingdom's Official Chart Company. "The Hanging Tree" was eventually certified platinum in Canada and Germany as well as double platinum in the United States. To promote the song, a remix by producer Michael Gazzo was released.

Background and release

"The Hanging Tree" was written by Suzanne Collins and originally appeared in her novel Mockingjay (2010); Jeremiah Fraites and Wesley Schultz from American indie folk band the Lumineers composed the track while production was handled by James Newton Howard.

Schultz revealed that director Francis Lawrence instructed him to create a melody that could be "hummed or sung by one person" or "by a thousand people"; he also informed Schultz not to make the song "overly complicated". To Schultz, the song felt like an innocent nursery rhyme despite its dark undertones. Schultz and Fraites then submitted a "couple melodies in about a day and a half or two days" during the month of September 2013. Lawrence later contacted both Schultz and Fraites via text message that the melody was chosen for the film, saying, "It worked out great in the movie. We just shot the scene. [Jennifer] was really nervous but it went great."

The lead protagonist Katniss Everdeen performs the song in the film, which is also heard over the closing credits. Jennifer Lawrence revealed on Late Night with David Letterman that she was anxious about singing the song in the film, citing her fear of "singing in front of other people" as her reason; she also disclosed that she cried on set when filming the scene. Francis confessed to Vulture that Jennifer Lawrence suggested New Zealand singer Lorde instead provide vocals for the track that she could lip sync to on film; Francis rejected this idea. In preparation, Francis sent Jennifer Lawrence to a vocal coach, in an effort to provide the actress with confidence; she also practiced singing "all day" for the scene.

"The Hanging Tree" was released as part of the film's score soundtrack on 24 November 2014; it is accompanied with a B-side titled "The Mockingjay". The track does not appear on the original release of the film's soundtrack. However, due to the success of "The Hanging Tree", it was later added to the digital extended edition of the soundtrack as the 15th track. On 9 December 2014, "The Hanging Tree" was released as the second single from the soundtrack. Michael Gazzo released a remix of the song—titled "The Hanging Tree" (Rebel Remix)—on 15 December 2014. In an interview with Yahoo! Music, Gazzo commented that despite the track's dark tonality, he envisioned the song "uplifting an entire group of people to rise up. To unite."

Composition and use in books

"The Hanging Tree" is composed in the key of A minor with a "moderately, somewhat freely" tempo of 88 beats per minute. Lawrence's vocals span a range of E3 to A5 and its chord progression follows a basic sequence of A5–Am–Asus–F/A. It is a folk ballad, accompanied with orchestral strings and a choir. Chris Payne of The Hollywood Reporter called it a "minimal folk sing-a-long".

WBUR noted that the song's themes represent the tropes of Appalachian music, which commonly used murder themes in their lyrics. "The Hanging Tree" received comparisons to other songs such as "Tom Dooley", Billie Holiday's 1939 ballad "Strange Fruit" (which also includes references to hanging and trees), and the civil rights protest song "We Shall Overcome" as well as a passage from Frederick Douglass' memoir My Bondage and My Freedom (1855) about African-American spirituals. In the film, Lawrence performs the song a cappella.

In the novel's context, it is a song that Katniss learned from her father, and is used as a battlecry. Katniss's mother prohibited the use of the song in her home after hearing Katniss and her sister Primrose chant the song while making necklaces. Peeta Mellark, Katniss's love interest, associates "The Hanging Tree" with her father; he heard him sing the song once when he traded goods at his parents' bakery.

According to Haymitch Abernathy, the song was the first memory Peeta associated with Katniss that did not trigger a "mental breakdown" after the Capitol propagandized him. After realizing this, Katniss uses "The Hanging Tree" as a remedy for Peeta's "Capitol-implanted hatred". She reminds herself of the song once more after Peeta tells her to kill him, in an effort to prevent himself from harming members of their rescue team due to how the Capitol "reprogrammed" him. In the adaption, however, Plutarch Heavensbee uses the film of Katniss singing as anti-Capitol propaganda and changes the lyrics from "necklace of rope" to "necklace of hope" to reduce some of the macabre undertones in the original song. Plutarch then uses the song as a rebel anthem.

In The Ballad of Songbirds and Snakes (2020), the song is revealed to have been penned by Lucy Gray Baird, the first Hunger Games victor from District 12. Baird wrote the song after she and Coriolanus Snow witnessed the execution of a rebel called Arlo Chance. Arlo was being hanged for killing three men and his lover, Lil, was in the crowd. When she screamed his name he yelled for her to run. The jabberjays in the area picked it up and after he was dead, continued to repeat it. That inspired the first two lines of the song. The song's namesake was the site where Baird would meet her former lover, Billy Taupe. The hangings were conducted from a tree because District 12 had not been provided with proper gallows at the time.

Reception and promotion

"The Hanging Tree" received positive reviews from music critics, with several critics complimenting its effectiveness as a murder ballad. Jeff Baker, writing for OregonLive.com called the song the best part of the film. Baker complimented Lawrence for turning the track into a "murder ballad that calls back to her Kentucky roots". Stereogum writer Gabriella Tully Claymore called it a "creepy-as-hell take on classic Americana murder ballads". Stephanie Merry from The Washington Post praised Lawrence's vocal delivery, commenting that her "raspy voice [matches] the dark narrative and Appalachian style of the music".

"The Hanging Tree" debuted at number 12 on the US Billboard Hot 100 for the week of 13 December 2014 and debuted outside the 50 position (2.1 million U.S. streams) on Streaming Songs, charting at number two (200,000 downloads sold) on Digital Songs and received eight spins on U.S. radio. "The Hanging Tree" became the highest-charting song from The Hunger Games franchise on the chart, surpassing "Eyes Open" by Taylor Swift, which peaked at number 19. Lawrence became one of 13 Academy Award-winning recipients to chart on the Hot 100; the last female Academy Award winner to achieve this feat was Cher with "Believe" (1998). The song peaked at number one in Austria, Germany and Hungary; it peaked in the top five in Australia. It was certified platinum by Music Canada (MC) and double platinum by the Recording Industry Association of America (RIAA).

"The Hanging Tree" was performed live for the first time at "Hollywood in Vienna", a gala honoring excellence in music. James Newton Howard performed with Edita Malovčić as a substitute for Lawrence; it was conducted by Keith Lockhart of the Boston Pops Orchestra. Howard was reportedly in tears after the performance and rose to his feet to give a standing ovation. To promote the song, Howard embarked on a European tour called "3 Decades of Music for Hollywood" and held a contest in search for a female vocalist, one for each tour date, that would sing Lawrence's verses.

Track listing

Personnel
Credits adapted from the liner notes of The Hunger Games: Mockingjay, Part 1 (Original Motion Picture Score).
Jennifer Lawrence – vocals
Suzanne Collins – songwriter
James Newton Howard – producer
Wesley Schultz – composer
Jeremiah Fraites – composer

Charts

Weekly charts

Year-end charts

Certifications

Release history

References

2014 songs
2014 singles
The Hunger Games music
Folk ballads
American folk songs
2010s ballads
Murder ballads
Songs about trees
Music based on novels
The Lumineers
Number-one singles in Austria
Number-one singles in Germany
Number-one singles in Hungary